Ezinqoleni Local Municipality was an administrative area in the Ugu District of KwaZulu-Natal in South Africa.

Ezinqoleni is an isiZulu name word meaning "at the wagons". Traffic in the early days was by wagon drawn by donkeys and post carts drawn by mules.

There is an acute shortage of basic services and facilities, housing, and employment.

After municipal elections on 3 August 2016 it was merged into the larger Ray Nkonyeni Local Municipality.

Main places
The 2001 census divided the municipality into the following main places:

Politics 
The municipal council consists of eleven members elected by mixed-member proportional representation. Six councillors are elected by first-past-the-post voting in six wards, while the remaining five are chosen from party lists so that the total number of party representatives is proportional to the number of votes received. In the election of 18 May 2011 the African National Congress (ANC) won a majority of eight seats on the council.
The following table shows the results of the election.

References

External links
 Official website

KwaZulu-Natal South Coast
Former local municipalities of South Africa
Local municipalities of the Ugu District Municipality